Kottappadi-Part is a village near Meppadi in Wayanad district in the state of Kerala, India.

Demographics
 India census, Kottappadi (Village) had a population of 21833 with 10839 males and 10994 females.

Transportation
Kottappadi Part is 85 km by road from Kozhikode railway station and this road includes nine hairpin bends. The nearest major airport is at Calicut. The road to the east connects to Mysore and Bangalore. Night journey is allowed on this sector as it goes through Bandipur national forest. The nearest railway station is Mysore.  There are airports at Bangalore and Calicut.

References

Villages in Wayanad district
Kalpetta area